Kang Sung-yeon (born July 21, 1976) is a South Korean actress. Kang made her acting debut in 1996 through MBC's Open Recruitment. Although her main profession was acting, she also contributed songs to several soundtracks and released two albums in 2001–2002 under the stage name Bobo. Then in 2005, Kang rose to fame when she played Prince Yeonsan's concubine Jang Nok-su in King and the Clown, a period film that drew 12.3 admissions, making it (at the time) the highest-grossing domestic film in Korean cinema history. Kang continued to star in television dramas such as Let's Get Married (2005), New Wise Mother, Good Wife (2007), Single Dad in Love (2008), Tazza (2008), and Wife Returns (2009). From 2012 to 2014, she hosted her own poetry reading program on EBS Radio.

Personal life
Kang married jazz pianist Kim Ka-on on January 6, 2012. Kang announced her pregnancy in July 2014.

Filmography

Television series

Film

Variety/radio show

Discography

Awards and nominations

References

External links 
 Kang Sung-yeon Fan Cafe at Daum 
 
 
 

1977 births
Living people
South Korean television actresses
South Korean film actresses
Hannam University alumni
Seoul Institute of the Arts alumni
People from Seoul
L&Holdings artists